John A. DeBaun Mill is a historic grist mill located at Tallman in Rockland County, New York.  It was built about 1845 and is a two-story, four by two bay, heavy timber frame, clapboard sheathed main block on a rubble stone foundation.  The main block is flanked by large shed roofed one story wings.  The property includes the mill building, a portion of the mill stream, and the site of the mill pond.  It regularly functioned as a mill until 1906.

It was listed on the National Register of Historic Places in 1993.

References

Grinding mills on the National Register of Historic Places in New York (state)
Industrial buildings completed in 1845
Buildings and structures in Rockland County, New York
Grinding mills in New York (state)
National Register of Historic Places in Rockland County, New York